The Music of Silence is a 2017 Italian biographical film directed by Michael Radford, based on the 1999 novel of the same name written by the tenor Andrea Bocelli and freely inspired by his childhood life until the beginning of his great career. Bocelli is played by Toby Sebastian with the alter ego of Amos Bardi. The Italian tenor physically appears in a scene of the film and his presence accompanies the entire film in the form of a first-person narrative.

Plot 
Born with an eye condition that eventually leads to his blindness, Andrea Bocelli pursues his ambition and becomes a popular singer and songwriter.

Cast
Toby Sebastian as Amos Bardi (Andrea Bocelli)
Luisa Ranieri as Edi
Jordi Molla as Sandro
Antonio Banderas as The Maestro
Ennio Fantastichini as Giovanni
Francesca Prandi as Katia
Anthony Souter as Umberto
Nadir Caselli as Ellonora
Alessandro Sperduti as Adriano
Francesco Salvi as Ettore

Reception

Box office 
, The Music of Silence has grossed $117,646 worldwide.

Critical response 
On review aggregator website Rotten Tomatoes, the film holds an approval rating of 0%, based on 17 reviews, and an average rating of 4.5/10. On Metacritic, the film has a weighted average score of 25 out of 100, based on 5 critics, indicating "generally unfavorable reviews".

References

External links 
 
 

Andrea Bocelli
2017 films
Biographical films about musicians
Biographical films about singers
Films about blind people
Italian biographical films
Cultural depictions of classical musicians
Cultural depictions of Italian men
2010s biographical films
Films set in 1958
Films set in the 1960s
Films set in 1971
Films set in 1973
Films set in 1976
Films set in 1978
Films set in 1984
Films set in 1988
Films set in 1989
Films set in 1991
Films set in 1993
Films set in Turin
Films set in Tuscany
2010s Italian films